Live in Bologna is a live album by jazz saxophonist Lou Donaldson, his second recording for the Timeless label, featuring Donaldson's quartet with Herman Foster, Jeff Fuller, and Victor Jones.

Reception
The album was awarded 3 stars in an Allmusic review by Steven Loewy who stated "the set as a whole has a joyous and even infectious exuberance that should provide an enjoyable, if light, listening experience".

Track listing
All compositions by Lou Donaldson except as indicated
 "Stella by Starlight" (Ned Washington, Victor Young) - 9:26  
 "Groovin' High" (Dizzy Gillespie) -  8:30  
 "Summertime" (George Gershwin, Ira Gershwin, DuBose Heyward) - 9:05  
 "Lou's Blues" -  9:21  
 "St. Thomas" (Sonny Rollins) - 6:11  
 "Star Eyes" (Gene DePaul, Don Raye) - 11:45
Recorded in Bologna, Italy in January, 1984.

Personnel
Lou Donaldson - alto saxophone, vocals
Herman Foster - piano
Jeff Fuller - bass
Victor Jones - drums

References

Lou Donaldson live albums
1984 live albums
Timeless Records live albums